The noosphere (alternate spelling noösphere) is a philosophical concept developed and popularized by the Russian-Ukrainian Soviet biogeochemist Vladimir Vernadsky, and the French philosopher and Jesuit priest Pierre Teilhard de Chardin. Vernadsky defined the noosphere as the new state of the biosphere and described as the planetary "sphere of reason". The noosphere represents the highest stage of biospheric development, that of humankind's rational activities.

The word is derived from the Greek νόος ("mind", "reason") and σφαῖρα ("sphere"), in lexical analogy to "atmosphere" and "biosphere". The concept cannot be accredited to a single author. The founding authors Vernadsky and de Chardin developed two related but starkly different concepts, the former grounded in the geological sciences, and the latter in theology. Both conceptions of the noosphere share the common thesis that together human reason and the scientific thought has created, and will continue to create, the next evolutionary geological layer. This geological layer is part of the evolutionary chain. Second-generation authors, predominantly of Russian origin, have further developed the Vernadskian concept, creating the related concepts: noocenosis and noocenology.

Founding authors
The term noosphere was first used in the publications of Pierre Teilhard de Chardin in 1922 in his Cosmogenesis. Vernadsky was most likely introduced to the term by a common acquaintance, Édouard Le Roy, during a stay in Paris. Some sources claim Édouard Le Roy actually first proposed the term. Vernadsky himself wrote that he was first introduced to the concept by Le Roy in his 1927 lectures at the College of France, and that Le Roy had emphasized a mutual exploration of the concept with Teilhard de Chardin. According to Vernadsky's own letters, he took Le Roy's ideas on the noosphere from Le Roy's article "Les origines humaines et l’evolution de l’intelligence", part III: "La noosphere et l’hominisation", before reworking the concept within his own field, biogeochemistry. The historian Bailes concludes that Vernadsky and Teilhard de Chardin were mutual influences on each other, as Teilhard de Chardin also attended the Vernadsky's lectures on biogeochemistry, before creating the concept of the noosphere.

An account stated that Le Roy and Teilhard were not aware of the concept of biosphere in their noosphere concept and that it was Vernadsky who introduced them to this notion, which gave their conceptualization a grounding on natural sciences. Both Teilhard de Chardin and Vernadsky base their conceptions of the noosphere on the term 'biosphere', developed by Edward Suess in 1875. Despite the differing backgrounds, approaches and focuses of Teilhard and Vernadsky, they have a few fundamental themes in common. Both scientists overstepped the boundaries of natural science and attempted to create all-embracing theoretical constructions founded in philosophy, social sciences and authorized interpretations of the evolutionary theory. Moreover, both thinkers were convinced of the teleological character of evolution. They also argued that human activity becomes a geological power and that the manner by which it is directed can influence the environment. There are fundamental differences in the two conceptions.

Concept

In the theory of Vernadsky, the noosphere is the third in a succession of phases of development of the Earth, after the geosphere (inanimate matter) and the biosphere (biological life). Just as the emergence of life fundamentally transformed the geosphere, the emergence of human cognition fundamentally transforms the biosphere. In contrast to the conceptions of the Gaia theorists, or the promoters of cyberspace, Vernadsky's noosphere emerges at the point where humankind, through the mastery of nuclear processes, begins to create resources through the transmutation of elements. It is a study area of the Global Consciousness Project.

For de Chardin, the noosphere emerges through and is constituted by the interaction of human minds. The noosphere has grown in step with the organization of the human mass in relation to itself as it populates the Earth. As mankind organizes itself in more complex social networks, the higher the noosphere will grow in awareness. This concept extends Teilhard's Law of Complexity/Consciousness, the law describing the nature of evolution in the universe. Teilhard argued the noosphere is growing towards an even greater integration and unification, culminating in the Omega Point - an apex of thought/consciousness - which he saw as the goal of history.

One of the original aspects of the noosphere concept deals with evolution. Henri Bergson, with his L'évolution créatrice  (1907), was one of the first to propose evolution is "creative" and cannot necessarily be explained solely by Darwinian natural selection. L'évolution créatrice is upheld, according to Bergson, by a constant vital force which animates life and fundamentally connects mind and body, an idea opposing the dualism of René Descartes. In 1923, C. Lloyd Morgan took this work further, elaborating on an "emergent evolution" which could explain increasing complexity (including the evolution of mind). Morgan found many of the most interesting changes in living things have been largely discontinuous with past evolution. Therefore, these living things did not necessarily evolve through a gradual process of natural selection. Rather, he posited, the process of evolution experiences jumps in complexity (such as the emergence of a self-reflective universe, or noosphere), in a sort of qualitative punctuated equilibrium. Finally, the complexification of human cultures, particularly language, facilitated a quickening of evolution in which cultural evolution occurs more rapidly than biological evolution. Recent understanding of human ecosystems and of human impact on the biosphere have led to a link between the notion of sustainability with the "co-evolution" and harmonization of cultural and biological evolution.

See also

Notes

References 
 Deleuze, Gilles and Félix Guattari, A Thousand Plateaus, Continuum, 2004, p. 77.
 Hödl, Elisabeth, "Die Noosphäre als Bezugsrahmen für das Recht" ("The noosphere as a framework for the conception of law") in: Schweighofer/Kummer/Hötzendorfer (ed.): Transformation juristischer Sprachen, Tagungsband des 15. Internationalen Rechtsinformatik Symposions, 2012, pp. 639–648.
 Oliver Krüger: Gaia, God, and the Internet - revisited. The History of Evolution and the Utopia of Community in Media Society. In: Online – Heidelberg Journal for Religions on the Internet 8 (2015), online Text.
 Norgaard, R. B. (1994). Development betrayed: the end of progress and a coevolutionary revisioning of the future. London; New York, Routledge. 
 Raymond, Eric (2000), "Homesteading the Noosphere", available online.
 Samson, Paul R.; Pitt, David (eds.) (1999), The Biosphere and Noosphere Reader: Global Environment, Society and Change. 
 Various authors (1997). "The Quest for a Unified Theory of Information", World Futures, Volumes "49 (3-4)" and "50 (1-4)", Special Issue

External links 

 "Evidence for the Akashic Field from Modern Consciousness Research" by consciousness researcher Dr. Stanislav Grof, M.D.
 The Place of the Noosphere in Cosmic Evolution (pdf)
 Global Consciousness project at Princeton
 Fortaleciendo la Inteligencia Sincrónica
 Unidad de Ciencia Noosféricas de la Universidad del Mar en Chile
 Transhumanist Declaration
 "Just Say Yes to the Noosphere", a Podcast from Stanford Law School
 Omega Point Institute Noosphere, Global Thought, Future Studies
 Semandeks A web application that tries to imitate Noosphere
 noosfeer A web application simulating the Noosphere by changing paradigms of content discovery
 Synaptic Web States that the Web is the substrate for the "sphere of human thought"

Concepts in metaphysics
Concepts in the philosophy of mind
Concepts in the philosophy of science
Cyberspace
History of philosophy
History of science
Holism
Information Age
Intellectual history
Metaphysical theories
Metaphysics of mind
Non-Darwinian evolution
Ontology
Philosophical concepts
Philosophical theories
Philosophy of religion
Philosophy of science
Philosophy of technology
Singularitarianism
Spirituality
Superorganisms
Thought
Transhumanism